The John B. Carpenter House is a historic house located at 42 Prospect Avenue in Plattsburgh, Clinton County, New York.

Description and history 
It was built in about 1845 and is a -story, rectangular-plan building. It sits on a stone foundation and features a gable roof.

It was listed on the National Register of Historic Places on November 12, 1982.

References

Houses on the National Register of Historic Places in New York (state)
Houses completed in 1845
Houses in Clinton County, New York
National Register of Historic Places in Clinton County, New York